Wizardry IV: The Return of Werdna (originally known as Wizardry: The Return of Werdna - The Fourth Scenario) is the fourth scenario in the Wizardry series of role-playing video games. It was published in 1987 by Sir-Tech Software, Inc. It was later ported on home consoles, such as the PC Engine CD and the PlayStation, through the Wizardry: New Age of Llylgamyn compilation.

The Return of Werdna is drastically different from the trilogy that precedes it. Rather than continuing the adventures of the player's party from the previous three games, The Return of Werdna's protagonist is Werdna, the evil wizard that was defeated at the end of Wizardry: Proving Grounds of the Mad Overlord and imprisoned at the bottom of his dungeon forever.

Gameplay
The game begins at the bottom of a 10-level dungeon. Most of Werdna's powers are depleted and must be gradually recovered throughout the game. The initial goal is to climb to the top of the dungeon, reclaiming Werdna's full power along the way. Each level has one or more pentagrams at specific points. The pentagrams have three purposes: The first time a pentagram is discovered in a level, Werdna's strength increases, and a portion of his powers are restored. This only happens once per level; finding multiple pentagrams on a single level will not increase his powers multiple times. The second purpose is that monsters may be summoned from the pentagrams. The higher the level, the stronger the monsters available. There is no cost to summoning monsters, but only three parties of monsters may be summoned at a time, and any existing monsters will be replaced by the summoned ones. The third purpose is that pentagrams refresh Werdna's health and spellcasting capacity.

Instead of fighting monsters, the player fights against the heroes from the past three Wizardry games. Players of the first three games who sent their character disks to Sir-Tech might have their characters present in Wizardry IV.

Production
The release of Wizardry IV was delayed for years, and did not get released until late 1987. Sir-Tech was confident that it would release the game in time for Christmas 1984 that the company told inCider to announce it as already available in the November 1984 issue. The company listed the game with a price in a 1985 catalog, but Computer Gaming World advised "I wouldn't send any money off for it yet; this has been one of the most-delayed games in adventure history (surpassing even the year-long wait for Ultima IV), and the date of its release is still up in the air". In 1986 Robert Woodhead attributed the delay in "certain 'un-named' products" at Sir-Tech to the time required to port them to UCSD p-System.

Difficulty

"The Return of Werdna" is considered an extremely difficult game; the designer was Roe R. Adams III, a well-known gamer and writer who was the first to solve Time Zone. Computer Gaming World stated, "This game was designed expressly for the expert Wizardry player." Knowledge of the first game of the series is vital to completing Wizardry IV. It is equally unforgiving of mistakes and bad luck as its predecessor trilogy, but unlike the trilogy, there are no experience points for defeating enemies, and therefore no reward for surviving difficult battles, or opportunities to grow stronger at the player's pace. The only way a player may grow stronger is to fight their way through the current level, and find a pentagram on the next level, no matter how overwhelmingly difficult the foes on the current level may be. Some of these foes include ninjas capable of killing Werdna instantly with a critical hit, mages with area-effect spells that can wipe out entire parties of monsters, thieves who can steal items that are critical to completing the game, and clerics capable of resurrecting Werdna's fallen adversaries.

Like the previous trilogy, mapping out levels is vital to avoid becoming lost. But the difficulty of mapping out levels is increased. While the previous games included occasional traps that could throw the player's maps off, such as dark areas, teleporters, pits, chutes, and rotating floors, these traps and many more are abundant in "The Return of Werdna". An early level contains a minefield, with an invisible safe path that can only be discovered through exhaustive trial and error. Another level is a series of seemingly identical intersecting pathways, with rotating floor tiles on each intersection. At the top of the dungeon is the Cosmic Cube, a 3D maze consisting of dozens of rooms, connected by passageways, chutes, ladders, and teleporters, all of which have their own unique tricks, traps, and mapping difficulties. In addition, some of the most deadly foes in the game roam the cosmic cube, and because it contains the final pentagram, no further strengthening is possible.

Another major example that seriously hinders unfamiliar players is the seemingly impossible task of exiting the very first room.  The only way out is a hidden door that may be revealed by casting a "light" spell called "Milwa".  The only way to do this is to recruit a group of Priests.  This seemingly simple task is made unintuitive due to the lack of any evidence that there is a door to begin with; the necessity of recruiting a group of Clerics, which are ineffective in combat and take the place of effective combat recruits; and the need to enter combat until the Clerics cast this spell.  There is no suggestion in the context of the game as to what Milwa or any other Cleric spell name means; only players familiar with prior Wizardry games would understand its function. To a player unfamiliar with these earlier Wizardry titles, it would seem that the Clerics cast a useless spell. Furthermore, the Milwa/Light spell eventually expires, meaning that there is a limited time to find the door once the spell is cast.  (Acknowledging the difficulty of this very first puzzle in the game, Sir-Tech included a sealed envelope in the game package containing its solution, to be opened if the player couldn't figure it out on their own.)

Copy protection
The Return of Werdna had an unusual form of copy protection. No attempt was made to prevent copying of the game disks.  Instead, the package included a book containing a long list of 16-digit "MordorCharge card" numbers, designed to resemble credit card numbers.  This book was printed on dark red paper to make photocopying difficult. After completing the first level in the game, the player is given a randomly chosen 12-digit number, and asked for the last four digits. The player must look up the corresponding number in the book and type it in to proceed.

This tactic effectively gave those who made copies of the game a free demo of the first level before demanding that the player show proof of purchase.  However, the algorithm for computing the MordorCharge numbers was not very complicated, and consisted of little more than adding three numbers modulo 9000. Those having knowledge of the method could calculate the correct response using a small lookup table and some relatively simple arithmetic.

Although such means of discouraging copying would be considered little more than a nuisance today, it was fairly effective at a time when few people had access to online services. A similar copy protection, with a more sophisticated code system, was used in the next Wizardry game, Wizardry V: Heart of the Maelstrom.

Reception
Scorpia of Computer Gaming World, who beta tested Wizardry IV, favorably reviewed it in 1987, stating that the game had been worth the long wait before release. She acknowledged that the game was very difficult (and requiring knowledge of Wizardry I), and that during testing "some of the best game players in the country tripped up somewhere (myself included)", but stated that it was "eminently fair and is, perhaps, one of the most finely-balanced games I've ever played. Every puzzle, every encounter, every clue ... has been worked out with careful exactitude". Scorpia criticized the resurrection of defeated enemies after saving and "the same dreary old Wizardry graphics", but concluded "Bottom line: Unique, and not to be missed!"

The game was previewed in 1988 in Dragon #130 by Hartley, Patricia, and Kirk Lesser in "The Role of Computers" column. The Lessers reviewed the IBM PC version of the game in 1989 in Dragon #142, and gave the game 3½ out of 5 stars.

Robbie Robberson previewed and profiled Return of Werdna in Space Gamer/Fantasy Gamer No. 82. Robberson commented that "should be this year's best game in fantasy simulation."

Wizardry IV sold very poorly. Despite the lengthy delay Sir-Tech had not advanced the technology from the first game; The Bard's Tale'''s graphics were superior, for example, despite being released two years earlier. Further, as Robert Sirotek of Sir-Tech later said, "It was insanely difficult to win that game":

In 1993 Sir-Tech advertised compilations of Wizardry'' I-III and V-VII. IV was not mentioned, but V was advertised as "breaking away from the Wizardry system of the past".

References

External links
 
 

1987 video games
Apple II games
First-person party-based dungeon crawler video games
NEC PC-8801 games
NEC PC-9801 games
Role-playing video games
Single-player video games
Video game sequels
Video games developed in the United States
Wizardry